David Bryant, better known by his stage name Passage, is an alternative hip hop rapper based in Oakland, California. He is a member of Restiform Bodies along with Bomarr and Telephone Jim Jesus.

History
Passage released his official debut album, The Forcefield Kids, on Anticon in 2004.

He is also a member of Brothers Backword along with Mike Busse. The duo released the Stupid Intelligent mixtape in 2009.

Discography

Studio albums
Passage
 Moods & Symptoms (2000) (with Bomarr)
 The Forcefield Kids (Anticon, 2004)
 Worked On (Illuminated Paths, 2017)

Restiform Bodies (Passage with Bomarr & Telephone Jim Jesus)
 Oubliette (2000)
 Restiform Bodies (6months, 2001)
 Sun Hop Flat (2001)
 TV Loves You Back (Anticon, 2008)

Brothers Backword (Passage with Mike Busse)
 Malfunction (2010) [unreleased]

EPs, mixtapes, compilations, singles
EPs
 Tennis, Piano and Other Primary Sightings [aka The Holy Phony Haunt] (2004)
 Pass Money Multi (2008)
 Pass and Touch (Marathon of Dope, 2011)

Mixtapes
 Stupid Intelligent (2009) (Brothers Backword)

Remix albums
 TV Loves You Back: Remixes (2013) (Restiform Bodies)

Compilations
 The B-Side Suicide Pageant (2002)
 Newbliette (Subversiv Rec, 2004) (Restiform Bodies)

Singles
 "I Want What You Want / Recycle America" (Weapon-Shaped, 2003) (Restiform Bodies)
 "Creature in the Classroom" (Anticon, 2004)

Appearances
Guest appearances
 Bomarr - "Plywood Never Got Paid" from Beats Being Broke (2002)
 Deep Puddle Dynamics - "We Ain't Fessin' (Double Quotes)" from We Ain't Fessin' (Double Quotes) (2002)
 DJ Krush - "Song for John Walker" from The Message at the Depth (2002)
 Telephone Jim Jesus - "Convertible Stingray" from A Point Too Far to Astronaut (2004)
 Pedestrian - "Anticon." from Volume One: UnIndian Songs (2005)
 Sole - "Isn't It Sad" from Songs That Went Tin (2005)
 Themselves - "Puzzled" from The Free Houdini (2009)

Featured tracks
 "The Unstrung Harp" & "Poem to the Hospital" on Anticon Label Sampler: 1999-2004 (2004)

References

External links
 

Anticon
American hip hop musicians
Musicians from the San Francisco Bay Area